Caladenia exilis subsp. exilis, commonly known as the salt lake spider orchid, is a plant in the orchid family Orchidaceae and is endemic to the south-west of Western Australia. It is a relatively common spider orchid with a single erect, hairy leaf and up to three white to greenish-cream flowers with a small white, red-striped labellum.

Description
Caladenia exilis subsp. exilis is a terrestrial, perennial, deciduous, herb with an underground tuber which grows in tufts. The lateral sepals and petals are more or less drooping with long, dark, thread-like tips. The edge of the labellum has short, forward-facing teeth and there are two rows of red to cream-coloured calli along its centre. Flowering occurs from July to September.

Taxonomy and naming
Caladenia exilis subsp. exiliswas first formally described in 2001 by Stephen Hopper & Andrew Brown and the description was published in Nuytsia. The specific epithet (exilis) is a Latin word meaning "thin" or "slender" referring to the thin petals, sepals and labellum.

Distribution and habitat
Salt lake spider orchid is relatively common between Woodanilling and Mullewa in the Avon Wheatbelt, Jarrah Forest and Mallee biogeographic regions where it grows near salt lakes in colonies of sometimes hundreds or thousands of plants.

Conservation
Caladenia exilis subsp. exilis  is classified as "not threatened" by the Western Australian Government Department of Parks and Wildlife.

References

exilis
Endemic orchids of Australia
Orchids of Western Australia
Plants described in 2001
Taxa named by Stephen Hopper
Taxa named by Andrew Phillip Brown